Leucaloa nyasica is a moth of the family Erebidae. It was described by George Hampson in 1911. It is found in Malawi and Zimbabwe.

References

 

Spilosomina
Moths described in 1911